Mary Anne Abercromby, 1st Baroness Abercromby of Aboukir (née Menzies; born ca. 1752 – 11 February 1821) was a Scottish peeress, socialite and the wife of General Ralph Abercromby.

Biography
Mary Anne was the daughter of John Menzies and Ann, daughter of Patrick Campbell.  She was created suo jure 1st Baroness Abercromby, of Aboukir and of Tullibody, in the County of Clackmannanshire, by Letters Patent on 28 May 1801. The barony was awarded in recognition of her late husband's gallantry at the Battle of Alexandria, at which he was mortally wounded. On her death in 1821 she was succeeded in the barony by George, her eldest son.

Family
She married Captain Ralph Abercromby (later Lt.-Gen. Sir Ralph Abercromby), son of George Abercromby and Mary Dundas, on 17 November 1767. They had children:
 Anne Abercromby (died 1844), married Donald Cameron, 22nd of Lochiel and had issue
 Mary Abercromby (died 1825)
 Catherine Abercromby (died 1841)
 George Abercromby, 2nd Baron Abercromby (1770–1843)
 Gen. Sir John Abercromby (1772–1817)
 James Abercromby, 1st Baron Dunfermline (1776–1858)
 Lt.-Col. Alexander Abercromby (1784–1853)

Notes

References
  Endnotes:
 
 

Abercromby, 1st Baroness}}
Abercromby, Mary Anne Abercromby, 1st Baroness
Abercromby, Mary Anne Abercromby, 1st Baroness
18th-century Scottish people
19th-century Scottish people
1
Hereditary peeresses of the United Kingdom created by George III
Scottish socialites
British baronesses
Mary
18th-century Scottish women
19th-century Scottish women
Wives of knights